Fatma Güldemet Sarı (born 25 June 1970) is a Turkish politician from the Justice and Development Party (AKP), who served as the Minister of Environment and Urban Planning from 24 November 2015 to 24 May 2016. She has been a Member of Parliament for the electoral district of Adana since 7 June 2015.

Early life and career
Born in Malatya, Sarı graduated from Yıldız Technical University as an architect, working in both Adana and Istanbul. She began her political career in 2008 after launching the AKP Çukurova district branch and served in the Adana AKP provincial branch between 2012 and 2014 before being elected as a Member of Parliament in 2015. She can speak fluent English.

See also
25th Parliament of Turkey

References

External links
 Collection of all relevant news items at Haberler.com
 Collection of all relevant news items at Milliyet
 Collection of all relevant news items at Son Dakika

Justice and Development Party (Turkey) politicians
Deputies of Adana
Members of the 25th Parliament of Turkey
Living people
People from Malatya
1970 births
Members of the 26th Parliament of Turkey
Members of the 64th government of Turkey
Yıldız Technical University alumni